This article is a list of diseases of impatiens, such as Busy Lizzie (I. walleriana).

Bacterial diseases

Fungal diseases

Nematodes, parasitic

Viral and viroid diseases

References
Common Names of Diseases, The American Phytopathological Society

Impatiens